Keijo Kuntola (born 28 February 1954) is a Finnish biathlete. He competed in the 10 km sprint event at the 1980 Winter Olympics.

References

External links
 

1954 births
Living people
Finnish male biathletes
Olympic biathletes of Finland
Biathletes at the 1980 Winter Olympics
People from Kurikka
Sportspeople from South Ostrobothnia